Durand is a city in and the county seat of Pepin County, Wisconsin, United States. The population was 1,854 at the 2020 census.

History
The Durand area was first settled in 1856 when 21-year-old Miles Durand Prindle came up the river in a keel boat named the "Dutch Lady," and took government land on the site of the present city. Originally named Bear Creek, Durand was incorporated on April 12, 1887.

Geography
Durand is located at  (44.628512, -91.961718).

Demographics

2010 census
As of the census of 2010, there were 1,931 people, 838 households, and 509 families living in the city. The racial makeup of the city was 98.1% White, 0.5% Native American, 0.2% African American, 0.1% Asian, 0.1% Pacific Islander, 0.3% from other races, and 0.8% from two or more races. Hispanic or Latino of any race were 0.8% of the population.

There were 838 households, of which 28.5% had children under the age of 18 living with them, 45.1% were married couples living together, 11.2% had a female householder with no husband present, 4.4% had a male householder with no wife present, and 39.3% were non-families. 35.3% of all households were made up of individuals, and 18.4% had someone living alone who was 65 years of age or older. The average household size was 2.20 and the average family size was 2.83.

The median age in the city was 44.2 years. 22.5% of residents were under the age of 18; 8% were between the ages of 18 and 24; 20.7% were from 25 to 44; 27.1% were from 45 to 64; and 21.8% were 65 years of age or older. The gender makeup of the city was 47.6% male and 52.4% female.

2000 census
As of the census of 2000, there were 1,968 people, 829 households, and 509 families living in the city. The population density was 1,229.4 people per square mile (474.9/km2). There were 876 housing units at an average density of 547.3 per square mile (211.4/km2). The racial makeup of the city was 98.93% White, 0.20% Native American, 0.15% Asian, 0.15% Black or African American, 0.05% Pacific Islander, and 0.51% from two or more races. 0.20% of the population were Hispanic or Latino of any race.

There were 829 households, out of which 29.9% had children under the age of 18 living with them, 49.6% were married couples living together, 9.8% had a female householder with no husband present, and 38.5% were non-families. 35.3% of all households were made up of individuals, and 20.5% had someone living alone who was 65 years of age or older. The average household size was 2.29 and the average family size was 2.99.

In the city, the population was spread out, with 24.8% under the age of 18, 7.8% from 18 to 24, 24.4% from 25 to 44, 19.9% from 45 to 64, and 23.1% who were 65 years of age or older. The median age was 41 years. For every 100 females, there were 90.3 males. For every 100 females age 18 and over, there were 87.5 males.

The median income for a household in the city was $30,064, and the median income for a family was $42,260. Males had a median income of $33,000 versus $19,250 for females. The per capita income for the city was $18,103. About 7.6% of families and 9.3% of the population were below the poverty line, including 10.2% of those under age 18 and 9.3% of those age 65 or over.

Healthcare 
AdventHealth Durand is a 25 bed critical access hospital (CAP) located in Durand. The hospital includes a level IV trauma center. There are two primary care clinics in Durand. The ratio of PCPs per 100,000 population in Durand is 20.8 compared to the Wisconsin statewide average of 75.6. Despite a hospital and two primary care clinics, Durand is located in both a mental health and primary care Health Professional Shortage Area (HPSA) qualifying the area as a medical desert. By the year 2035, Durand is expected to have a 36% deficit in primary care physicians. There are no behavioral health physicians in Durand.

Education
Durand MS/HS High School is the local public school. 

During the early 1950s, consolidation of schools in Durand and environs resulted in some Catholic institutions serving as public schools, causing controversy and protests from Protestant residents based on the principle of "separation of church and state".

Media

Radio

Notable people
James Allison - Wisconsin State Representative
Thomas Dreier - editor, writer, and publisher
Karl J. Goethel - Lawyer and legislator
Horace E. Houghton - Washington and Wisconsin state legislator
William H. Huntington - Wisconsin State Representative
John Morgan - Wisconsin State Representative
Helen Parkhurst - American educator
Robert L. Pierce - Chairman of the Republican Party of Wisconsin
Samuel L. Plummer - Wisconsin State Representative
George E. Scott - Wisconsin State Senator
George Tarrant Sr. - Wisconsin State Representative and first mayor of Durand
Mamre H. Ward - Wisconsin State Representative

References

External links

 Durand, Wisconsin
 Durand history
 Sanborn fire insurance maps: 1894 1900 1904 1910 1916

Cities in Wisconsin
Cities in Pepin County, Wisconsin
County seats in Wisconsin
Populated places established in 1856
1856 establishments in Wisconsin